"Hearts" is a song written by Jesse Barish and performed by Marty Balin in 1981, included in his debut solo album Balin. It was Balin's third single in nineteen years (after his distant and unsuccessful songs "Nobody but You" and "I Specialize in Love"/"You Are the One" of 1962 ) and the biggest hit of his solo career.

It reached #8 on the Billboard Hot 100, #9 on the U.S. adult contemporary chart, and #20 on the U.S. rock chart in 1981.

The song was produced by John Hug.

The single ranked #41 on the Billboard Year-End Hot 100 singles of 1981.

Chart history

Weekly charts

Year-end charts

Cover versions
James Last released a version of the song on his 1981 album, Non Stop Dancing ’82 – Hits Around the World.
Dalida released a version of the song in France entitled "Nostalgie" on her 1982 album, Spécial Dalida.
Sydne Rome released a version in 1982.
Seija Simola released a version of the song in Finland entitled "Tunne" on her 1984 album, Tunteet.
Marina Lima released a version of the song on her 1987 album, Virgem.
Jefferson Starship released a live version on their 2001 album, Across the Sea of Suns.
Philipp Kirkorov released a version of the song in Russia entitled "Сердце Ждёт" on her 2012 album, ''Сердце Ждёт".

References

1981 songs
1981 singles
Songs written by Jesse Barish
Marty Balin songs
EMI America Records singles